Sankt Jakob im Rosental is a town in the district of Villach-Land in the Austrian state of Carinthia.

Geography
The municipality borders on Slovenia in the south, and the northern boundary is formed by the Drau River. It lies in the western part of the Rosen valley.

Population
According to the 2001 census 16.4% of the population are Carinthian Slovenes.

History
In the Carinthian Plebiscite of 1920, Sankt Jakob was one of the 17 Carinthian municipalities, where the majority of the population (54%) voted for the annexation to the Kingdom of Serbs, Croats and Slovenes (Yugoslavia).
However, since 59% of the voters in the entire voting zone A were in favour of remaining with Austria, the municipal area also remained with Carinthia.

Personalities
Among the famous natives of the municipality were the Slovene philologists Matija Ahacel and Anton Janežič.

References

Cities and towns in Villach-Land District